Charles Kramer may refer to:
 Charles Kramer (attorney) (1916–1988), American attorney
 Charles Kramer (economist) (1907–1992), American economist, accused of being a spy for the Soviet Union
 Charles Kramer (politician) (1879–1943), Representative from California
 Charles Kramer (producer), American television producer

See also
 Chas Kramer, a character in the film Constantine